A Mile from Home is a 2013 Nigerian action-drama film written, produced and directed by Eric Aghimien, starring Tope Tedela, Chiedozie Sambasa Nzeribe, Alex Ayalogu, Eric Nwanso and Tolu Akinbileje. Tedela portrays Lala, a university student with an identity crisis who joins a notorious gang to get revenge. The film was nominated in two categories at the 2nd Africa Magic Viewers' Choice Awards and won best actor in a drama for Tedela.
The movie won the 2014 Africa Movie Academy Award for Achievement in Visual Effect.

Plot 
A Mile from Home chronicles the life of a university student, Jude Odaro/Lala (Tope Tedela) who joined a gang in his quest to avenge an injustice meted out to him by Stone, a notorious gangster who forcefully dispossesses him of a precious possession.

Suku (Chiedozie Nzeribe), the Leader of the gang loves him and made him the number two man in the gang. Suku introduced him into crime and trusted him with everything he has and control. Jude got more committed to the gang and earned a new name, Lala. Jude finally yielded to his feeling for, Ivie, Suku's girlfriend and he is willing to die loving her.

Don Kolo, who was convicted for drug dealing just got out of jail and deported from South Africa. He is broke and desperately wants to start his drug business at home. he needs supplies but has no money.
Suku and his men got a big supply from their contact Chief Lukas and Don Kolo will do anything to take it from them.

Cast 
Tope Tedela as Lala
Chiedozie 'Sambasa' Nzeribe as Suku
Alex Ayalogu as Don Kolo
Tolu Akinbileje as Ivie
Eric Nwanso as Deba

Awards and nominations

See also
 List of Nigerian films of 2013

References 

2013 action drama films
Nigerian action drama films
2013 films
Best Visual Effects Africa Movie Academy Award winners
English-language Nigerian films
2010s English-language films